Acteocina canaliculata is a species of gastropods belonging to the family Tornatinidae.

The species is found in America. It mostly inhabits the waters of the east coast of North America. The veliger larvae feed on plankton.

References

Bulloidea
Gastropods described in 1826
Marine molluscs of North America